West Lane Technology Learning Center is an online charter school in Elmira, Oregon, United States. It is located on the campus of Elmira High School.

Academics
In 2008, 43% of the school's seniors received their high school diploma. Of 47 students, 20 graduated, 15 dropped out, and 12 are still in high school.

References

High schools in Lane County, Oregon
Charter schools in Oregon
Public high schools in Oregon